The Portable Document Format (PDF) was created by Adobe Systems, introduced at the Windows and OS|2 Conference in January 1993 and remained a proprietary format until it was released as an open standard in 2008. Since then, it is under the control of International Organization for Standardization(ISO) Committee of volunteer industry experts.

PDF was developed to share documents, including text formatting and inline images, among computer users of disparate platforms who may not have access to mutually-compatible application software. It was created by a research and development team called Camelot, led by Adobe's co-founder John Warnock. PDF was one among a number of competing formats such as DjVu, Envoy, Common Ground Digital Paper, Farallon Replica and even Adobe's own PostScript format. In those early years before the rise of the World Wide Web and HTML documents, PDF was popular mainly in desktop publishing workflows.

PDF's adoption in the early days of the format's history was slow. Adobe Acrobat, Adobe's suite for reading and creating PDF files, was not freely available; early versions of PDF had no support for external hyperlinks, reducing its usefulness on the Internet; the larger size of a PDF document compared to plain text required longer download times over the slower modems common at the time; and rendering PDF files was slow on the less powerful machines of the day.

Adobe distributed its Adobe Reader (now Acrobat Reader) program free of charge from version 2.0 onwards, and continued supporting the original PDF, which eventually became the de facto standard for fixed-format electronic documents.

In 2008 Adobe Systems' PDF Reference 1.7 became ISO 32000:1:2008. Thereafter, further development of PDF (including PDF 2.0) is conducted by ISO's TC 171 SC 2 WG 8 with the participation of Adobe Systems and other subject matter experts.

Adobe specifications 

From 1993 to 2006 Adobe Systems changed the PDF specification several times to add new features. Various aspects of Adobe's Extension Levels published after 2006 were accepted into working drafts of ISO 32000-2 (PDF 2.0), but developers are cautioned that Adobe's Extensions are not part of the PDF standard.

Adobe declared that it is not producing a PDF 1.8 Reference. Future versions of the PDF Specification will be produced by ISO technical committees. However, Adobe published documents specifying what proprietary extended features for PDF, beyond ISO 32000-1 (PDF 1.7), are supported in its newly released products. This makes use of the extensibility features of PDF as documented in ISO 32000–1 in Annex E.

The specifications for PDF are backward inclusive. The PDF 1.7 specification includes all of the functionality previously documented in the Adobe PDF Specifications for versions 1.0 through 1.6. Where Adobe removed certain features of PDF from their standard, they are not contained in ISO 32000-1 either. Some features are marked as deprecated.

ISO standardization 
On January 29, 2007, Adobe announced that it would release the full Portable Document Format 1.7 specification to the American National Standards Institute (ANSI) and the Enterprise Content Management Association (AIIM), for the purpose of publication by the International Organization for Standardization (ISO). By virtue of this change, ISO produces versions of the PDF specification beyond 1.7, and Adobe will be only one of the ISO technical committee members.

ISO standards for "full function PDF" are published under the formal number ISO 32000. Full function PDF specification means that it is not only a subset of Adobe PDF specification; in the case of ISO 32000-1 the full function PDF includes everything defined in Adobe's PDF 1.7 specification. However, Adobe later published extensions that are not part of the ISO standard. There are also proprietary functions in the PDF specification, that are only referenced as external specifications. These were eliminated in PDF 2.0, which includes no proprietary technology.

PDF documents conforming to ISO 32000-1 carry the PDF version number 1.7. Documents containing Adobe extended features still carry the PDF base version number 1.7 but also contain an indication of which extension was followed during document creation.

PDF documents conforming to ISO 32000-2 carry the PDF version number 2.0, and are known to developers as "PDF 2.0 documents".

ISO 32000-1:2008 (PDF 1.7) 

The final revised documentation for PDF 1.7 was approved by ISO Technical Committee 171 in January 2008 and published as ISO 32000-1:2008 on July 1, 2008, and titled Document management – Portable document format – Part 1: PDF 1.7.

ISO 32000-1:2008 is the first ISO standard for full function PDF. The previous ISO PDF standards (PDF/A, PDF/X, etc.) are subsets intended for more specialized uses. ISO 32000-1 includes all of the functionality previously documented in the Adobe PDF Specifications for versions 1.0 through 1.7. Adobe removed certain features of PDF from previous versions; these features are not contained in PDF 1.7 either.

The ISO 32000-1 document was prepared by Adobe Systems Incorporated based upon PDF Reference, sixth edition, Adobe Portable Document Format version 1.7, November 2006. It was reviewed, edited and adopted under a special fast-track procedure, by ISO Technical Committee 171 (ISO/TC 171), Document management application, Subcommittee SC 2, Application issues, in parallel with its approval by the ISO member bodies.

According to the ISO PDF standard abstract:

ISO 32000-1:2008 specifies a digital form for representing electronic documents to enable users to exchange and view electronic documents independent of the environment they were created in or the environment they are viewed or printed in. It is intended for the developer of software that creates PDF files (conforming writers), software that reads existing PDF files and interprets their contents for display and interaction (conforming readers) and PDF products that read and/or write PDF files for a variety of other purposes (conforming products).

Some proprietary specifications under the control of Adobe Systems (e.g. Adobe Acrobat JavaScript or XML Forms Architecture) are in the normative references of ISO 32000-1 and are indispensable for the application of ISO 32000-1.

ISO 32000-2: 2017 (PDF 2.0) 

A new version of the PDF specification, ISO 32000-2 (PDF 2.0) was published by ISO's TC 171 SC 2 WG 8 Committee in July, 2017.

The goals of the ISO committee developing PDF 2.0 include evolutionary enhancement and refinement of the PDF language, deprecation of features that are no longer used (e.g. Form XObject names), and standardization of Adobe proprietary specifications (e.g. Adobe JavaScript, Rich Text).

Known in PDF syntax terms as "PDF-2.0", ISO 32000-2 is the first update to the PDF specification developed entirely within the ISO Committee process (TC 171 SC 2 WG 8). Interested parties resident in TC 171 Member or Observer countries and wishing to participate should contact their country's Member Body or the secretary of TC 171 SC 2. Members of the PDF Association may review and comment on drafts via that organization's Category A liaison with ISO TC 171 SC 2.

ISO 32000-2: 2020 (PDF 2.0) 

In December 2020, the second edition of PDF 2.0, ISO 32000-2:2020, was published, including clarifications, corrections and critical updates to normative references. ISO 32000-2 does not include any proprietary technologies as normative references.

ISO TC 171 SC 2 WG 8 

Formed in 2008 to curate the PDF Reference as an ISO Standard, ISO TC 171 SC 2 Working Group 8 typically meets twice a year, with members from fifteen or more countries attending in person. Attendance is also possible via conference call.

ISO standardized subsets of PDF 

Since 1995, Adobe participated in some of the working groups that create technical specifications for publication by ISO and cooperated within the ISO process on specialized subsets of PDF standards for specific industries and purposes (e.g. PDF/X or PDF/A). The purpose of specialized subsets of the full PDF specification is to remove those functions that are not needed or can be problematic for specific purposes and to require some usage of functions that are only optional (not mandatory) in the full PDF specification.

The following specialized subsets of PDF specification has been standardized as ISO standards (or are in standardization process):
 PDF/X (since 2001 - series of ISO 15929 and ISO 15930 standards) - a.k.a. "PDF for Exchange" - for the Graphic technology - Prepress digital data exchange - (working in ISO Technical committee 130), based on PDF 1.3, PDF 1.4 and later also PDF 1.6
 PDF/A (since 2005 - series of ISO 19005 standards) - a.k.a. "PDF for Archive" - Document management - Electronic document file format for long-term preservation (working in ISO Technical committee 171), based on PDF 1.4 and later also ISO 32000-1 - PDF 1.7
 PDF/E (since 2008 - ISO 24517) - a.k.a. "PDF for Engineering" - Document management - Engineering document format using PDF (working in ISO Technical committee 171), based on PDF 1.6
 PDF/VT (since 2010 - ISO 16612-2) - a.k.a. "PDF for exchange of variable data and transactional (VT) printing" - Graphic technology - Variable data exchange (working in ISO Technical committee 130), based on PDF 1.6 as restricted by PDF/X-4 and PDF/X-5
 PDF/UA (since 2012 - ISO 14289-1) - a.k.a. "PDF for Universal Accessibility" - Document management applications - Electronic document file format enhancement for accessibility (working in ISO Technical committee 171), based on ISO 32000-1 - PDF 1.7

Other standardized subsets of PDF 
The PDF Association published a subset of PDF 2.0 called PDF/raster 1.0 in 2017. PDF/raster is intended for storing, transporting and exchanging multi-page raster-image documents, especially scanned documents.

References

External links
 Who Created the PDF? June 18, 2015 blogpost by Adobe Corporate Communications archived

Portable Document Format
Adobe Inc.